The SkyReach BushCat is a South African light-sport aircraft developed from the Rainbow Aircraft Cheetah by Vladimir Chechin of SkyReach Aircraft. The aircraft is supplied as a kit for amateur construction or as a complete ready-to-fly-aircraft.

Design
The BushCat is a two-place side-by-side configuration, strut-braced, high-wing monoplane. The main upgrades from the earlier Cheetah XLS are the use of sprung aluminum landing gear, cockpit ergonomic changes to the location of the stick and throttle and hydraulic disc brakes in place of mechanical drum brakes.

The BushCat's structure is fabric-covered aluminum tube construction. The standard engines used are the  Rotax 912UL and the  Rotax 912ULS powerplants. The plane features dual throttles, a single center-mounted control stick and flaps controlled by a ceiling-mounted bar. Landing gear options are tricycle gear, conventional landing gear and floats.

The design is a US Federal Aviation Administration accepted special light-sport aircraft with the Rotax 912UL, Rotax 912ULS, the  Jabiru 2200 and  Rotax 582 engines fitted.

Operational history
In April 2018 there were 26 BushCats registered in the United States with the Federal Aviation Administration.

Specifications (BushCat)

See also

References

External links

Light-sport aircraft